Cordera Eason (born September 7, 1987) is an American football running back, athletic trainer and coach. He played college football at Ole Miss from 2006-2009. He was signed by the Cincinnati Bengals as an undrafted free agent in 2010, his career was cut short due to an injury. In April 2012 he signed with IFL team Colorado Ice for two consecutive seasons. In 2015, Eason returned to Ole Miss to finish his Bachelor's in Social Work and serve as a student coach for the Ole miss Rebels Football Team. Eason served two years as the Offensive Head Coach for Magnolia Middle School and three years as the Running Back coach for Meridian High School. In 2017, Eason partnered with college and high school teammate Derrick Davis to create sports training business Elite Technique. He is a former assistant baseball coach and current assistant football and track coach for the Lamar Raiders, P.E. Coach at Meridian Classical Center for Learning and a Field Ambassador for Fellowship of Christian Athletes. He is married to Rankin Eason and has four children.

External links
Ole Miss Rebels bio

1987 births
Living people
Players of American football from Mississippi
American football running backs
Ole Miss Rebels football players
Cincinnati Bengals players
Colorado Crush (IFL) players